Sky Box Office is a group of four movie pay-per-view channels operated in New Zealand by Sky. Films currently premiere on Sky Box Office a few months after their release. The channel previously broadcast PPV sporting events, before Sky Arena was created.

Former logos

External links
Official site

Television stations in New Zealand
English-language television stations in New Zealand